Yhonathan Barrios (born December 1, 1991) is a Colombian former professional baseball pitcher. He had previously played in Major League Baseball (MLB) for the Milwaukee Brewers.

Career

Pittsburgh Pirates
Barrios was signed by the Pittsburgh Pirates on July 5, 2008, as an infielder out of Colombia. The Pirates converted him to a pitcher in July 2013.

Milwaukee Brewers
On July 23, 2015, Barrios was traded to the Brewers in exchange for infielder Aramis Ramírez. He made his MLB debut on September 24, and began the 2016 season on the disabled list after having a shoulder injury. Barrios was outrighted off the 40-man roster on November 9, 2016. He elected free agency on November 6, 2017.

References

External links

1991 births
Living people
Sportspeople from Cartagena, Colombia
Colombian expatriate baseball players in the United States
Major League Baseball players from Colombia
Major League Baseball pitchers
Milwaukee Brewers players
Venezuelan Summer League Pirates players
Gulf Coast Pirates players
West Virginia Power players
Bradenton Marauders players
Senadores de San Juan players
Colombian expatriate baseball players in Puerto Rico
Altoona Curve players
Indianapolis Indians players
Biloxi Shuckers players
State College Spikes players
Jamestown Jammers players
Tigres de Aragua players
Colombian expatriate baseball players in Venezuela